John M. Dow (1873 – unknown) was a Scottish footballer. His regular position was as a defender. He was born in Dundee. He played for Dundee, Manchester United, Dundee Old Boys, and Fairfield Athletic.

External links
MUFCInfo.com profile

1873 births
Footballers from Dundee
Scottish footballers
Dundee F.C. players
Manchester United F.C. players
Fairfield Athletic F.C. players
Year of death missing
Association football defenders